Joel D. Whitaker (October 5, 1877 – October 13, 1947) was an American ophthalmologist and college football player and coach. He was hired as one of the first coaches of the Guilford Quakers in 1897, posting a 2–2–1 record. Whitaker played college football at the University of North Carolina, where he was a prominent fullback, described by Kemp Plummer Battle as "probably the university's best all around athlete." In the 1895 Georgia vs. North Carolina football game, Whitaker threw what is purported by some to be the first forward pass. He picked an all-time UNC team in 1910.

Whitaker was born on October 5, 1877, in Warrenton, North Carolina.  He died on October 13, 1947, at St. Vincent Indianapolis Hospital in Indianapolis, Indiana.

References

External links
 

1877 births
1947 deaths
American football fullbacks
American football punters
American football quarterbacks
American ophthalmologists
Guilford Quakers football coaches
North Carolina Tar Heels football players
North Carolina Tar Heels baseball players
People from Warrenton, North Carolina
Players of American football from Raleigh, North Carolina
Physicians from Florida
Physicians from Indiana